Ryan Caulfield: Year One is an American crime drama that aired from October 15, 1999, to October 22, 1999. The series' original title was going to be The Badland, and an article appeared in the 1999 Fall Preview edition of TV Guide under that name.

Premise
Ryan Caulfield is a 19-year-old cop who is assigned to one of Philadelphia's toughest areas.

Cast
Sean Maher as Ryan Caulfield
Richard Portnow as Sgt. Palermo
Roselyn Sánchez as Kim Veras
Michael Rispoli as Vincent Susser
James Roday as Vic
Chad Lindberg as Phil Harkins
Clifton Powell as Lt. Vaughn
Brenda Bakke as Mrs. Caulfield

Episodes

In addition, a ninth episode, entitled "King of Hearts", was written by Ted Mann, but was not produced.

Reception
In its season premiere, the show attracted 4.48 million viewers and a 1.7 rating, 6 share, in adults 18-49 resulting in Fox's lowest regular-season 18-49 rating in the slot since at least 1994. The show was cancelled after its second episode.

References

External links
 
 
 

1999 American television series debuts
1999 American television series endings
1990s American crime drama television series
1990s American police procedural television series
English-language television shows
Fox Broadcasting Company original programming
Television shows set in Philadelphia
Television series by 20th Century Fox Television
Television series created by James DeMonaco